Pitfour Castle is an 18th-century country house situated on the southeast edge of the village of St Madoes in the Carse of Gowrie, Perthshire, Scotland. It is a Category A listed building.

History
A tower house was formerly sited slightly closer to the River Tay, although nothing now remains. In June 1592 Harry Lindsay and 40 armed followers attacked the "Place of Pitfour" at night. They hid themselves close to the house and sent a messenger boy to get the yard gates or "yetts" opened. The trick worked but David Cochrane's defenders beat them back and closed the gates. Lindsay's men then managed to break into the castle, and forced the family and their retainers out, and put in his own men under his servant John Tweedy.

The present Pitfour Castle was built for John Richardson (1760–1821), a wealthy local man involved with the salmon fisheries of the Tay, around 1784. The design of the new house is attributed to the architect Robert Adam (1728–1792): although there is no documentary evidence for his involvement, there are stylistic similarities with Adam's later "castle-style" homes, such as Dalquharran Castle in Ayrshire (1786) and Seton Castle in Lothian (1789). In 1825, the house was enlarged to designs by William Burn, with a library to the north-west and a clock tower to the south-west.

By the 1860s the house was occupied and owned by Sir John Stewart-Richardson (who had adopted the additional name of Stewart on inheritance of his grandfather, James Stewart's, Urrard estate)  together with his family.

Having fallen into disrepair, restoration work on Pitfour Castle began in 1964. In 1966, Burn's entrance hall was removed, revealing Adam's original entrance front. In July 1969, as restoration was nearing completion, the east wing was badly damaged by fire.

In 1974 it was purchased by Lord Leslie Charles Field who at the time owned Walton Hall, Warwickshire. The Castle was rescued from demolition and restored back to its former glory to be used by the family of Lord Field for holidays. At the end of the 70’s the castle was subdivided into individual apartments and sold. The stable block has also been converted into a series of two storey dwelling houses, which along with the lodge house, are also privately owned. Some of the apartments are available to rent on short-assured tenancy agreements.

Interior

The curved staircase forms the centrepiece of the house. In the 1967 sale particulars, this was described as a "fine circular wrought iron staircase rising through the house to a cupola with painted cartoons by Ritchie". Historic Scotland refers to these cartoons as "figure panels by Zucchi", an Italian who worked with Robert Adam. Prior to its subdivision, the house had 12 principal bedrooms, four bathrooms, five reception rooms and staff accommodation.

References

Category A listed buildings in Perth and Kinross
Houses in Perth and Kinross